The goje (the Hausa name for the instrument) is one of the many names for a variety of one or two-stringed fiddles from  West Africa, almost exclusively played by ethnic groups inhabiting the Sahel and Sudan sparsely vegetated grassland belts leading to the Sahara.  Snakeskin or lizard skin covers a gourd bowl, and a horsehair string is suspended on bridge. The goje is played with a bowstring.

The goje is commonly used to accompany song, and is usually played as a solo instrument, although it also features prominent in ensembles with other West African string, wind or percussion instruments, including the Shekere, calabash drum, talking drum, or Ney.

The instrument is tied to various pre-Islamic Sahelian rituals around jinn possession, such as the Bori and Hauka traditions of the Maguzawa Hausa, Zarma, Borori, and Songhay. These instruments are held in high esteem and are their use are linked to the spirit world, or as a carrier for voices aimed at or from the spirit world.

The various names by which the goje is known by include goge or goje (Hausa, Zarma), gonjey (Dagomba, Gurunsi), gonje, (Mamprusi, Dagomba), njarka (Songhay), n'ko (Bambara, Mandinka and other Mande languages), riti (Fula, Serer), and nyanyeru or nyanyero.

Among the Hausa, another smaller fiddle called the kukkuma exists, whose use is associated with more secular acts, but it played in a similar way to that of the slightly larger and esteemed goje.

See also
Imzad, a similar instrument used by the Tuareg people

References
Liner notes by Steve Jay in "Ghana: Ancient Ceremonies: Dance Music & Songs," Nonesuch Explorer Series, 1979, re-released, 2002. catalog number or ASIN: B00006C75Y

External links
"Goge" at ASZA.com
Nyanyeru  at Musical Instrument Museum

Drumhead lutes
West African musical instruments
Bowed instruments
Yoruba musical instruments
Bowed monochords
Speech-surrogate instruments
Hausa musical instruments